The Collectivity of Saint Martin requires its residents to register their motor vehicles and display vehicle registration plates. Current plates are European standard 520 mm × 110 mm, and use French stamping dies. The overseas departments and territories of France have three-digit codes based on the numbering system for departments in France, starting with 97, which was originally the single code designating overseas territories.

See also 
Vehicle registration plates of Sint Maarten

References

Saint Martin
Transport in the Collectivity of Saint Martin
Collectivity of Saint Martin-related lists